The 1997 Swedish Golf Tour, known as the Telia InfoMedia Golf Tour for sponsorship reasons, was the 14th season of the Swedish Golf Tour, a series of professional golf tournaments held in Sweden, Denmark, Norway and Finland.

A number of the tournaments also featured on the 1997 Challenge Tour.

Schedule
The season consisted of 16 events played between May and October.

Order of Merit

References

Swedish Golf Tour